Sar Takht-e Do Rahan (also Romanized as Sar Takht-e Do Rāhān and Sar Takht-e Dūrāhān; also known as Sar Takht) is a village in Qilab Rural District, Alvar-e Garmsiri District, Andimeshk County, Khuzestan Province, Iran. At the 2006 census, its population was 21, in 5 families.

References 

Populated places in Andimeshk County